The London Marathon, one of the six World Marathon Majors, has been contested by men and women annually since 29 March 1981.

The inaugural marathon had 7,741 entrants, 6,255 of whom completed the race. The first Men's Elite Race was tied between American Dick Beardsley and Norwegian Inge Simonsen, who crossed the finish line holding hands in 2 hours, 11 minutes, 48 seconds. The first Women's Elite Race was won by Briton Joyce Smith in 2:29:57. In 1983, the first wheelchair races took place. Organized by the British Sports Association for the Disabled (BASD), 19 people competed and 17 finished. Gordon Perry of the United Kingdom won the Men's Wheelchair Race, coming in at 3:20:07, and Denise Smith, also of the UK, won the Women's Wheelchair Race in 4:29:03.

Twenty athletes representing the United Kingdom have won the London Marathon a total of forty times. The most recent win by a British athlete was in the 2012 London Marathon, by David Weir in the Men's Wheelchair Race. It was his sixth win in London. Kenya has the second largest number of winning athletes. Seven Kenyan men and seven Kenyan women have been victorious a total of eighteen times, all in the able-bodied category. Eleven men, including those from the wheelchair races, have won the marathon more than once, Weir's six wins being the record. Sixteen women have been winners more than once; Tanni Grey-Thompson won the women's wheelchair race six times between 1992 and 2002.

Course records for the London Marathon have been set ten times in the men's race, seven times in the women's race, sixteen times in the men's wheelchair race, and seventeen times in the women's wheelchair race. World records for marathon running have been set six times considering marks for men and women in mixed sex and women-only races. Khalid Khannouchi, representing the United States, set the men's world record in 2:05:38 in 2002. The following year, British runner Paula Radcliffe set the women's world record in 2:15:25, which also stands as the current course record in the Women's Elite Race. In 2017 Kenyan Mary Keitany ran a women-only race world record of 2:17:01.  Eliud Kipchoge of Kenya set the course record at 2:02:37 in 2019 in the Men's Elite Race. Marcel Hug of Switzerland set the Men's Wheelchair Race course record at 1:26:27 in 2021. The course record for the Women's Wheelchair Race was set by Swiss athlete Manuela Schär in 2021, with 1:39:52.

Elite race – men's winners

Elite race – women's winners

Wheelchair race – men's winners

Wheelchair race – women's winners

Victories by nationality

References 
General
 

Specific

External links
 Virgin London Marathon Official London Marathon website
 London Marathon World Marathon Majors website
 London Marathon BBC London minisite

London

Marathon